Edmund Law Rogers (July 1, 1850 – December 19, 1893), also known under the pseudonym Leslie Edmunds, was a stage actor who appeared in dramas such as The Octoroon. He is also a founding father of the Kappa Sigma fraternity at the University of Virginia.

Early life
Rogers was born 1 July 1850 in Baltimore, Maryland to a prominent Maryland family.  He was a descendant of Martha Washington (great-great-great grandmother) and Elizabeth Parke Custis Law (great-grandmother).  The family estate, Druid Hill, today is one of the largest city parks in North America.  

Rogers prepared for college at the James Kinner Academy in Baltimore, where founder Frank Courtney Nicodemus was one of his classmates.  As with George Miles Arnold, Rogers entered the University of Virginia as a first-year student in 1869.  He succeed Arnold as Grand Master of Zeta Chapter.  Rogers studied architecture and also developed an interest in acting.  His graphic talent is apparent in the badge of Kappa Sigma Fraternity, which Rogers designed.

Career
Eventually his interest in acting turned into a career in the theater in 1880. Rogers was a popular lead and supporting actor for productions of the time.  He was quick of wit and possessed enormous charm. Rogers died 19 December 1893; he was buried in his family's cemetery, the Rogers-Buchanan Family Cemetery in Baltimore, Maryland in Druid Hill.

Personal life
Rogers, who married Charlotte Matilda Leeds, died on December 19, 1893.

References

External links

Male actors from Baltimore
American male stage actors
Kappa Sigma founders
1850 births
1893 deaths
19th-century American male actors